Alex Szabó may refer to:
 Alex Szabó (footballer, born 1998)
 Alex Szabó (footballer, born 2002)